Lawton Mounds is a historic archaeological site located near Johnson's Landing, Allendale County, South Carolina. The site consists of two low earthen flat-topped mounds and surrounding village area, enclosed by a ditch and parapet. The North Mound is essentially rectangular, 65 feet by 70 feet at the base, standing 5 feet above the terrace. The South Mound is 100 feet distant from the first, also rectangular, 70 feet by 85 feet at the base and 7 feet, 6 inches high.

It was added to the National Register of Historic Places in 1972.

References

Archaeological sites on the National Register of Historic Places in South Carolina
National Register of Historic Places in Allendale County, South Carolina